The closing ceremony of the 2016 Summer Olympics was held on 21 August 2016 from 20:00 to 22:50 BRT at the Maracanã Stadium, Rio de Janeiro, Brazil.

As per traditional Olympic protocol, the ceremony featured cultural presentations from both the current (Brazil) and following (Japan) host countries, as well as closing remarks by International Olympic Committee (IOC) president Thomas Bach and the leader of the Games' organizing committee Carlos Arthur Nuzman, the official handover of the Olympic flag from Rio de Janeiro mayor Eduardo Paes to Tokyo governor Yuriko Koike, whose city hosted the 2020 Summer Olympics, and the extinguishing of the Olympic flame.

Venue

For the 2014 FIFA World Cup and the 2016 Olympics and Paralympics, a major reconstruction project was initiated for the Maracanã Stadium. The original seating bowl, with a two-tier configuration, was demolished, giving way to a new one-tier seating bowl. The original stadium's concrete roof was removed and replaced with a fiberglass tensioned membrane coated with polytetrafluoroethylene. The new roof covers 95% of the seats inside the stadium, unlike the former design, where protection was only afforded to some seats in the upper ring and those above the gate access of each sector.

Proceedings

Parade of Athletes

The creative director for the ceremony was Rosa Magalhães. Amid heavy rainfall, the ceremony began with interpretive dancers representing various landmarks in the host city, with music from the Brazilian group Barbatuques, singing "Beautiful Creatures", a song from the 2014 American animated film Rio 2. Martinho da Vila then performed a rendition of the classic song "" by Pixinguinha. In another segment, introducing the athletes, pop singer Roberta Sá channeled Carmen Miranda, the fruit-headdress-wearing, midcentury Hollywood diva who endures as a beloved camp figure. The Parade of Flags followed shortly after a choir of 27 children, representing the states of Brazil, sang the Brazilian national anthem.

The ceremony featured a performance of "Carry Me" by Norwegian electronic music artist Kygo and American singer-songwriter Julia Michaels, as part of a segment that launched the new Olympic Channel service launching after the Games. The games' final medal awards for the men's marathon were also presented, along with the Kenyan national anthem. The final medalists are listed below : 

 Eliud Kipchoge - Gold Feyisa Lilesa  - Silver Galen Rupp - Bronze

Four newly elected members of the IOC Athletes' Commission were introduced: fencer Britta Heidemann (Germany), table tennis player Ryu Seung-min (South Korea), swimmer Dániel Gyurta (Hungary) and pole vaulter Yelena Isinbayeva (Russia). Lenine then performed his song "Jack Soul Brasileiro" with slowly modificated lyrics in celebration to those who volunteered during the games. The flag handover ceremony began as standard with the Greek national anthem and the Olympic anthem sung in English. Rio de Janeiro mayor Eduardo Paes handed the flag to IOC president Thomas Bach, who then handed it over to Tokyo governor Yuriko Koike. The flag was raised again in PyeongChang for the 2018 Winter Olympics on 9 February 2018 for the opening ceremony.

Warming up! Tokyo 2020

The directors for the show were Hiroshi Sasaki (creative supervisor), Ringo Sheena (creative supervisor and music director), Mikiko Mizuno (choreographer and stage director) and Kaoru Sugano (creative director). Tokyo 2020's presentation for the next Olympics featured swimmer Kosuke Kitajima, long-distance runner Naoko Takahashi, boxer Ryōta Murata and Prime Minister Shinzō Abe. The Japanese national anthem arranged by Jun Miyake was sung while the flag of Japan was projected onto the stadium grounds while another flag was raised on the flagpole in the stadium. The flag then faded out to thank those who aided the country after the 2011 Tōhoku earthquake and tsunami.

A video presentation featuring characters from famous Japanese anime and prominent video games such as Captain Tsubasa, Doraemon, Pac-Man and Hello Kitty led up to Abe's appearance, which consisted of him transforming into Mario from Nintendo's Mario franchise and jumping out of a Warp Pipe given by Doraemon to help him get from Tokyo's Shibuya Crossing to Rio de Janeiro's Maracanã Stadium on time. Abe appeared at the Maracanã dressed up as Mario.

Male rhythmic gymnasts from Aomori University and dancers from Elevenplay then performed a dance routine highlighting Japan's electronic culture (choreographed by Mikiko, dance director of Elevenplay), music by Capsule member Yasutaka Nakata (the songwriter and producer for popular Japanese idol artists Perfume and Kyary Pamyu Pamyu) before the presentation ended with the logo of the forthcoming Tokyo games. The last sequence of presentation used the music from Tokyo Metropolitan Theatre's 2012 play "Egg" (written by Hideki Noda, with music by Ringo Sheena) – contains the message: "'sports, music or Olympics' and 'War or Nationalism' shall not be linked again."

Carnival Finale

Speeches by organising committee chairman Carlos Arthur Nuzman and IOC president Bach declared the Games closed, as he called them 'Marvelous Olympic Games in The Marvelous City'. Mariene de Castro sang a rendition of ‘Pelo Tempo Que Durar’ by Marisa Monte in front of the Olympic cauldron as the flame was extinguished via piped rain. The ceremony ended with a fireworks display and a tribute to Rio's signature event, the Carnival, which takes place during the four days before Ash Wednesday. The segment showcased Brazil's musical dance culture. The 250-person strong parade was led by Brazilian model Izabel Goulart, the actress Leandra Leal as "goodmother of Cordão da Bola Preta carnival block" and street cleaner Renato Sorriso, with the city anthem and a carnival anthem Cidade Maravilhosa playing in the background. The performers in the closing ceremony consisted of currently six main singers of samba schools: Ciganerey (Mangueira), Emerson Dias (Grande Rio), Ito Melodia (União da Ilha), Leozinho Nunes (São Clemente), Tinga (Unidos da Tijuca) and Wantuir (Paraíso do Tuiuti), and actual dancers who will be in the 2017 Rio Carnival.

Music

 Carnival Anthems medley
 "Cidade Maravilhosa"
 "Marcha do Cordão da Bola Preta"
 "Me dá um dinheiro aí?"
 "Mamãe Eu Quero"
 "Sassaricando"
 Samba Schools medley
 "É Hoje" - União da Ilha (1982)
 "O Amanhã" - União da Ilha (1978)
 "Macunaíma, Herói da nossa gente" - Portela (1975)
 "Quero Morrer no Carnaval" - Linda Batista (1962)
 "Festa para um Rei Negro" - Salgueiro (1971)
 "A Lenda das sereias, Rainhas do mar" - Império Serrano (1976)
 "A criação do mundo na tradição nagô" - Beija-Flor (1978)
 "Aquarela Brasileira" - Império Serrano (1964)
 "Maria Bethânia: A menina dos olhos de Oyá" - Mangueira (2016)
 "Tambor" - Salgueiro (2009)

Anthems
  27 children from each state from Brazil – Brazilian national anthem
  London Philharmonic Orchestra - Kenyan national anthem
  London Philharmonic Orchestra – Greek national anthem
  Projeto More – Olympic Hymn
  NHK Tokyo Children's Choir and Otowa Yurikago Kai – Japanese national anthem

Officials and guests

  Prime Minister Shinzō Abe

See also
2016 Summer Paralympics closing ceremony

Television coverage
Brazil - Globo TV; United States - NBC; United Kingdom - BBC

Notes

References

External links

 Rio 2016 Olympic Games Closing Ceremony Media Guide (as found on the Olympic Library)

Closing ceremony
Ceremonies in Brazil
Olympics closing ceremonies
Super Mario